is a Professor Emeritus at Nara Women's University in Japan, most notable for her work in the fields of mathematical biology and theoretical ecology. Her established career in academia has seen many of her journals published to acclaim, as well as contributing to the education of researchers at Kyoto University and Doshisha University. Shigesasda has served as the Research Supervisor for the Basic Research Program PRESTO in the research area "Innovative Models of Biological Processes and its Development", supported by the Japan Science and Technology Agency from 2007-2013. She has also served as Secretary General and President for The Japanese Society for Mathematical Biology. In 2013, she was awarded the Akira Okubo Prize.

Career 
In the 1970s Shigesasda was an active member of Mumay Tansky, a group composed of Shigesasda and colleagues Ei Teramoto, Hiroshi Ashida, Hisao Nakajima, Kohkichi Kawasaki, and Norio Yamamura. The group, organised by Teramoto, published papers on structure, stability and efficiency of ecosystems.

In 1979, Shigesada focused on the observational study of the spatial distribution of ant lions by ecologist Masaaki Morisita. She studied the concept of the structures of experience and consciousness (phenomenology) with regards to environmental density and the degree to which a habitat might be unfavourable. She introduced a model that combined population pressure, due to mutual interference between individuals, with environmental potential. Shigesasda extended Morisita's work, explaining how coexistence of competing species can arise through spatial segregation.

In the last twenty years, Shigesada studied pine wilt disease which is caused by the pinewood roundworm with a pine sawyer beetle as vector. Through the study of population dynamics, she estimated beetle densities and parameter values, finding that there is a threshold host density above which the disease can spread, and that the minimum density critically depends on the eradication rate.

Notable works

References 

Living people
Year of birth missing (living people)
Academic staff of Kyoto University
Academic staff of Doshisha University
Mathematical and theoretical biology
Japanese biologists